Richard Bernhard Smith (September 29, 1901 – September 29, 1935) was an American composer who wrote the lyrics to the popular Christmas song "Winter Wonderland", which was composed by Felix Bernard.

Smith was born on September 29, 1901, in Honesdale, Pennsylvania, the son of Eliza (Brunig) and John H. Smith, a partner with a glass manufacturing plant. His family was Episcopalian. He graduated Honesdale School in 1920 and attended Pennsylvania State College. Smith married Jean Connor, of Scranton, on March 30, 1930. He was diagnosed with tuberculosis in 1931. He succumbed to the disease on September 29, 1935, his thirty-fourth birthday, in Carbondale, Pennsylvania. He was buried in Dyberry Cemetery, Honesdale, Pennsylvania.

References

American lyricists
1901 births
1935 deaths
20th-century deaths from tuberculosis
People from Honesdale, Pennsylvania
Songwriters from Pennsylvania
Tuberculosis deaths in New York (state)